Lethbridge County is a municipal district in southern Alberta, Canada. It is in Census Division No. 2 and part of the Lethbridge census agglomeration. It was known as the County of Lethbridge prior to December 4, 2013. Its name was changed in time for 2014 to coincide with its 50th anniversary.

History 
Lethbridge County encompasses an area that was originally under the jurisdiction of six municipalities. It was originally formed as the Municipal District of Lethbridge No. 25 on January 1, 1954 by amalgamating the municipal districts of Bright No. 16 and Barons No. 25 and portions of Special Area No. 4, the County of Vulcan No. 2 and the municipal districts of Warner No. 4 and Sugar City No. 5. Ten years later, on January 1, 1964, the Municipal District of Lethbridge No. 25 joined with Lethbridge School Division No. 7 to become the County of Lethbridge No. 26. It subsequently changed its name to the County of Lethbridge on September 6, 2000 and then again to Lethbridge County on December 4, 2013.

Geography

Communities and localities 
The following urban municipalities are surrounded by Lethbridge County.
Cities
Lethbridge
Towns
Coaldale
Coalhurst
Picture Butte
Villages
Barons
Nobleford
Summer villages
none

The following hamlets are located within Lethbridge County.
Hamlets
Chin
Diamond City
Fairview
Iron Springs
Monarch
Shaughnessy
Turin

The following localities are located within Lethbridge County.
Localities 

Agriculture Research
Albion Ridge
Broxburn
Commerce
Eastview Acres
Ghent
Kipp
Lenzie
McDermott or McDermott Subdivision

Piyami
Stewart
Stewart Siding
Sunset Acres
Tempest
Tennion
Westview Acres
Whitney
Wilson or Wilson Siding

Demographics 

In the 2016 Census of Population conducted by Statistics Canada, Lethbridge County had a population of 10,353 living in 2,968 of its 3,129 total private dwellings, a  change from its 2011 population of 10,046.

Economy 
The economy of the county is primarily agricultural, including the well known "Feedlot Alley", a 500 km2 area of intensive livestock operations.

Government 
The county is governed by a council of seven councillors, elected every four years, from seven electoral divisions. The last election was in October 2013. The council chooses a reeve to be their head. It meets in offices located in Lethbridge.

See also 
List of communities in Alberta
List of municipal districts in Alberta

References

External links 

 
Municipal districts in Alberta